Leiocithara is a genus of sea snails, marine gastropod mollusks in the family Mangeliidae.

Ch. Hedley originally proposed Leiocithara as a subgenus of Eucithara for a group of smooth shells having the contour of Eucithara, but without the characteristic grain sculpture.

Species
Species within the genus Leiocithara include:
 Leiocithara angulata (Reeve, 1846)
 Leiocithara apollinea (Melvill, 1904)
 Leiocithara costellarioides Kilburn, 1992
 Leiocithara infulata (Hedley, 1909)
 Leiocithara lischkei (E. A. Smith, 1888)
 Leiocithara longispira (E. A. Smith, 1879)
 Leiocithara macrocephala (Thiele, 1925)
 Leiocithara musae (Thiele, 1925)
 Leiocithara opalina (E. A. Smith, 1882)
 Leiocithara perlucidula Kilburn, 1992
 Leiocithara porcellanea Kilburn, 1992
 Leiocithara potti (Sturany, 1900)
 Leiocithara translucens (Barnard, 1958)
 Leiocithara zamula Kilburn, 1992

References

External links
 Bouchet, P.; Kantor, Y. I.; Sysoev, A.; Puillandre, N. (2011). A new operational classification of the Conoidea. Journal of Molluscan Studies. 77, 273-308
  Tucker, J.K. 2004 Catalog of recent and fossil turrids (Mollusca: Gastropoda). Zootaxa 682:1-1295.
 Worldwide Mollusk Data base : Mangeliidae
 Kilburn R.N. 1992. Turridae (Mollusca: Gastropoda) of southern Africa and Mozambique. Part 6. Subfamily Mangeliinae, section 1. Annals of the Natal Museum, 33: 461–575
 MNHN, Paris: Leiocithara sp.

 
Gastropod genera